Two very different Honda motorcycles are commonly referred to as the Superhawk in various parts of the world.

The Honda CB77 Superhawk was a 305 cc,  parallel twin made in the '60s.
The Honda VTR1000F Superhawk was a 996 cc,  V-twin introduced in the '90s.

Superhawk